Michael Smith (born 1952) is a British author who specializes in spies and espionage. He is also a former member of the board of the Bletchley Park Trust.

Smith is a former soldier and journalist best known for obtaining and publishing the documents collectively known as The Downing Street Memos. The Downing Street memo itself was an official record of a meeting of the British war cabinet held in July 2002. It revealed the disclosure by Sir Richard Dearlove, then the head of the British Secret Intelligence Service (MI6), that the intelligence to justify an invasion was being "fixed around the policy". The Downing Street memo was in fact just one of eight documents obtained by Smith which showed that President George W. Bush and Prime Minister Tony Blair agreed in April 2002 to invade Iraq; that they planned to "wrongfoot" Saddam Hussein to give them the excuse to do so; and that they used flights over the southern no-fly zone of Iraq to begin the air war against Iraq in May 2002, with "spikes of activity" which they hoped might provoke Iraq into reacting and giving them the excuse to go to war.

Smith won a British Press Award in 2006 for Specialist Writer of the Year. The award was for his work in revealing the Downing Street memo.

Smith obtained the first six of the eight Downing Street Memos while working for the Daily Telegraph. The second set of two documents, including the Downing Street memo itself, were obtained while he was working for the Sunday Times. He has also worked for the BBC and contributed to The Raw Story and New Statesman.

He is the author of a number of books, including the UK Number 1 bestseller Station X: The Codebreakers of Bletchley Park (1998). This was subsequently televised and updated in 2011 as The Secrets of Station X: How the Bletchley Park Codebreakers Helped Win the War. Other books by Smith include Killer Elite: The Inside Story of America's Most Secret Special Operations Team (2006), which was updated in May 2011 to include the first accurate account of the killing of Osama bin Laden.

Smith's book Foley: The Spy Who Saved 10,000 Jews (1999) led to Frank Foley, the MI6 head of station in Berlin during the 1930s being made Righteous Among the Nations, the highest award the Jewish state can award to a gentile. According to Jewish aid workers, Foley saved "tens of thousands" of Jews from the Holocaust, giving them visas and passports to which they were not entitled, going into the concentration camps to get Jews out, and in the period after Kristallnacht in November 1938, hiding five or six Jews in his home every night. Foley: The Spy Who Saved 10,000 Jews was republished by Biteback as a Dialogue Espionage Classic in 2016.

Before becoming a journalist, Smith was a member of the British Army, serving for nine years in the Intelligence Corps. After leaving the Army, he worked as a journalist, initially for BBC Monitoring. He then joined the Daily Telegraph where he worked as an assistant foreign editor, then a news reporter and finally Defence Correspondent. In 2005, he joined the Sunday Times where he specialised in defence and intelligence issues. Smith left the Sunday Times in 2012 to become a full-time author.

Smith's most recent book is No Man Dies Twice, a detective/spy thriller set in Nazi Germany during the Second World War.

Books by Michael Smith  
Elphick, Peter and Smith, Michael : Odd Man Out: The Story of the Singapore Traitor (1993, Hodder and Stoughton) 
Smith, Michael : New Cloak, Old Dagger: How Britain’s Spies Came in from the Cold (1996, Gollancz) 
Smith, Michael : Station X (1998, Boxtree) 
Smith, Michael : Foley: The Spy Who Saved 10,000 Jews (1999, Hodder and Stoughton) 
Smith, Michael and Erskine, Ralph (editors): Action This Day (2001, Bantam) 
Smith, Michael : The Spying Game (2003, Politicos) 
Smith, Michael : Killer Elite: The Inside Story of America’s Most Secret Special Operations Team (2007, St Martin's Press) 
Smith, Michael : Six: A History of Britain’s Secret Intelligence Service (2010, Biteback) 
Smith, Michael : The Emperor's Codes (2010, Biteback) 
Smith, Michael : Britain’s Secret War (2011, Andre Deutsch) 
Smith, Michael : The Secrets of Station X (2011, Biteback) 
Smith, Michael : Bletchley Park: The Codebreakers of Station X (2013, Shire) 
Smith, Michael (editor): The Secret Agent’s Bedside Reader (2014, Biteback) 
Smith, Michael : The Debs of Bletchley Park and Other Stories (2015, Aurum) 
Smith, Michael : The Anatomy of a Traitor (2017, Aurum) 
Smith, Michael : No Man Dies Twice (2018, Diversion)

Notes 

1952 births
Living people
British male journalists
British military writers
The Sunday Times people
20th-century British writers
21st-century British writers
20th-century British male writers